Anton Erkoreka (1950, Biscaya, Basque Country) is a Basque historian of medicine and an ethnographer. He is director of the Basque Museum of the History of Medicine and Science, located at the University of the Basque Country. His areas of specialization include the history of diseases, in particular the Spanish flu pandemic, folk medicine, such as the evil eye and the study of human populations.

Works

References

Basque academics
Spanish medical historians
1950 births
Living people
University of the Basque Country people
People from Bermeo